Carline Bouw (born 14 December 1984 in Epe) is a Dutch rower.

References
 

1984 births
Living people
Dutch female rowers
People from Epe, Netherlands
Rowers at the 2012 Summer Olympics
Rowers at the 2016 Summer Olympics
Olympic rowers of the Netherlands
Olympic silver medalists for the Netherlands
Olympic bronze medalists for the Netherlands
Olympic medalists in rowing
Medalists at the 2012 Summer Olympics
Medalists at the 2016 Summer Olympics
World Rowing Championships medalists for the Netherlands
21st-century Dutch women
20th-century Dutch women
Sportspeople from Gelderland